Nevado San Francisco, or Cerro San Francisco, is a stratovolcano on the border between Argentina and Chile, located just southeast of San Francisco Pass. It is considered extinct and is one of the several  peaks in the area, of which the chief is the Ojos del Salado. It is on the border of 2 provinces: Argentinean province of Catamarca; Chilean province of Copiapo.

It is composed from andesite with the exception of basaltic cones and lava flows on the eastern side. These cones are part of the Peinado lineament and a sample was dated 200,000 years ago by argon chronology. They are noteworthy for their olivine phenocrysts. The western slopes contain dacitic lava domes. On the summit lie two circle-shaped constructs, of Inca or Formative period ages. San Francisco was first climbed by Walther Penck (Germany) on 16 December 1913.

Notes

See also

References

External links 

 Elevation information about San Francisco
 Weather Forecast at San Francisco

Volcanoes of Atacama Region
Stratovolcanoes of Argentina
Andean Volcanic Belt
Stratovolcanoes of Chile
Mountains of Argentina
Mountains of Chile
Polygenetic volcanoes
Mountains of Atacama Region
Mountains of Catamarca Province
Pleistocene stratovolcanoes